The Planet of Youth is a  science fiction novella by American writer Stanton A. Coblentz.  It was first published in book form in 1952 by Fantasy Publishing Company, Inc. in an edition of 600 copies, of which 300 were hardback.  The novel originally appeared in the October 1932 issue of the magazine Wonder Stories.

Plot introduction
The novel concerns the first real estate boom on the planet Venus.

Reception
Boucher and McComas found the novel to have dated badly, "pleasing in period for its irony and economy, but pretty slight today."

References

Sources

1952 American novels
1952 science fiction novels
American science fiction novels
Works originally published in Wonder Stories
Novels set on Venus
Works by Stanton A. Coblentz
Fantasy Publishing Company, Inc. books